Muhammad Toha (born 30 January 1997) is an Indonesian professional footballer who plays as a right-back for Liga 1 club Persita Tangerang.

Club career

Persita Tangerang
He was signed for Persita Tangerang to play in Liga 2 in the 2017 season. He had to give up his job as a municipal police to pursue his dream as a professional footballer. Toha scored his first-team goal with an equalizer in a 4–4 draw against Blitar Bandung United on 13 August 2019. After undergoing several matches with Persita in 2019 Liga 2, finally Toha can feel the highest caste of Indonesian football. Persita's success in being promoted to the Liga 1 is inseparable from Toha's role, he became one of the players who had the most minutes competing in the 2019 season and proved how important his role was in guarding the club's defense.

On 7 January 2020, Persita's management announced that Toha and 11 other players have extended their contracts with Persita for the next season. On 1 March 2020, he made his high caste league debut by starting in a 0–0 draw over Bali United at Kapten I Wayan Dipta Stadium. He played 3 times for the club in 2020 Liga 1 because the league was officially discontinued due to the COVID-19 pandemic.

On 28 August 2021, he started his match in the 2021–22 Liga 1 for Persita in a 1–2 win over Persipura Jayapura. On 22 October, Toha captained Persita for the first time in the high caste Liga 1 against Persikabo 1973.

Toha give assists goal by Taylon Correa in Persita's 3–3 draw over PSIS Semarang on 20 March 2022. Toha ended the 2021–22 season with 34 league appearances and 1 assists.

On 25 July 2022, he started his match as a captain club in the 2022–23 Liga 1 for Persita in a 2–0 win over Persik Kediri. On 14 August, he made his 100th appearance for the club as Persita won 1–2 at Persis Solo. Toha give two assists in Persita's 4–1 win over RANS Nusantara on 13 December.

Career statistics

Club

Honours

Club
Persita Tangerang
 Liga 2 runner-up: 2019

References

External links
 Muhammad Toha at Soccerway
 Muhammad Toha at Liga Indonesia

1997 births
Living people
Indonesian footballers
Persita Tangerang players
Liga 1 (Indonesia) players
Liga 2 (Indonesia) players
Association football fullbacks
People from Bontang
Sportspeople from East Kalimantan